Corie is a given name. Notable people with the name include:

Corie Andrews (born 1997), English footballer 
Corie Beveridge (born 1974), Canadian curler
Corie Blount (born 1969), American basketball player
Corie Mapp (born 1978), British-Barbadian para athlete and soldier
Corinne "Corie" Stoddard (born 2001), American short track speed skater

See also
Corrie (given name)
Corey, given name and surname
Cory, given name and surname
Korie, given name and surname